Alonso Brito (born 1950) is a Latin, alternative, salsa singer, songwriter born in Havana, Cuba. The Los Angeles Times has compared him to "part Mick Jagger, part Caetano Veloso, and part Desi Arnaz on acid" and as a face for Los Angeles salsa music. During his time in Miami as a socialite he was known to have owned many nightclubs and rubbed shoulders with the likes of Barry Gibb and Donald Fagen.

Life and music career

Early life
Brito was born in La Havana, Cuba in 1950. At the age of 10, a year after Fidel Castro took power in 1960, Brito was forced to leave due to political and civil unrest.

Moving to Miami at a young age he attended an all-boys Catholic prep school. Somewhat Catholic he still practiced Buddhism as well as Afro-Cuban Santería.

Musical rise
Brito's first instrument was the drum, which he played in psychedelic rock bands.

He fronted hard-working bands such as Watchdog and Beat Poets, dabbling in styles from smooth jazz, reggae, and British pop to a Latin-tinged style dubbed "troparock."

In Miami, he was known as Dennis Britt; an eclectic musician, nightclub manager, and a night time socialite who rubbed shoulders with the likes of Barry Gibb and Donald Fagen. After separating from his wife he became a fixture of the Miami music scene during the '80s and '90s. "The singer spent his life as a bohemian troubadour, playing in bars, working in various bands and writing songs."

As a respected songwriter he moved to Nashville in the 90s to help write songs for Raul Malo and The Mavericks; contributing to the country band's Grammy-award winning playlists writing for their song "Things I Cannot Change".

Alonso Brito moved to Los Angeles in 2006, signed with Candor Entertainment and is currently working on the record Santo Bueno to be released in 2008.

Discography

See also
Music of Cuba
Afro-Cuban
List of Famous Afro-Latinos

References

External links
Official website

Alonso Brito at Myspace
Alonso Brito article NewsOK
Alonso Brito with Los Angeles Times
Alonso Brito with The Boston Globe

1950 births
Living people
Cuban musicians